= Kiruba Munusamy =

Human Rights Lawyer in India

Kiruba Munusamy is a human rights lawyer and Dalit activist. She works on caste discrimination and gender violence cases. She is practising in the Supreme Court of India. She is the founder-executive director of Legal Initiative for Equality.
